
Liu Yu is the name of:

Han dynasty
 Liu Yu, Prince of Lu (劉餘; died 128 BC), Western Han prince, son of Emperor Jing
 Liu Yu (Ziqi) (劉瑜), style name Ziqi (子奇), Eastern Han official
 Liu Yu (warlord) (劉虞; died 193), Eastern Han nobleman and warlord

Liu Song dynasty
 Emperor Wu of Liu Song (363-422), personal name Liu Yu (劉裕), founder of Liu Song
 Emperor Ming of Liu Song (439-472), personal name Liu Yu (劉彧)
 Emperor Houfei of Liu Song (463-477), personal name Liu Yu (劉昱)

Song dynasty
 Liu Yu (Song dynasty) (劉豫; 1073–1146), Qi puppet emperor installed by Jin dynasty (1115–1234)

Contemporary people
 Liu Yu (political scientist) (刘瑜; born 1975), Chinese writer and political scientist
 Liu Yu (swimmer) (born 1982)
 Liu Yu (para swimmer) (born 1989), double Paralympic gold medal swimmer
 Liu Yu (footballer) (刘宇; born 1985)
 Liu Yu (baseball) (born 1991), Chinese baseball player
 Liu Yu (singer) (born 2000), Chinese singer
 Yu Liu (professor), American historian, professor and Guggenheim Fellow
 Yu Liu (entrepreneur) (刘禹; born 1986)